Evolutionary epistemology refers to three distinct topics: (1) the biological evolution of cognitive mechanisms in animals and humans, (2) a theory that knowledge itself evolves by natural selection, and (3) the study of the historical discovery of new abstract entities such as abstract number or abstract value that necessarily precede the individual acquisition and usage of such abstractions. As a branch of inquiry in epistemology, evolutionary epistemology lies at the crossroads of philosophy and evolutionary biology.

Cognition in biological evolution 

"Evolutionary epistemology" can refer to a branch of inquiry in epistemology that applies the concepts of biological evolution to the growth of animal and human cognition. It argues that the mind is in part genetically determined and that its structure and function reflect adaptation, a nonteleological process of interaction between the organism and its environment. A cognitive trait tending to increase inclusive fitness in a given population should therefore grow more common over time, and a trait tending to prevent its carriers from passing on their genes should show up less and less frequently.

Growth of knowledge 

"Evolutionary epistemology" can also refer to a theory that applies the concepts of biological evolution to the growth of human knowledge, and argues that units of knowledge themselves, particularly scientific theories, evolve according to selection.  In this case, a theory—like the germ theory of disease—becomes more or less credible according to changes in the body of knowledge surrounding it.

One of the hallmarks of evolutionary epistemology is the notion that empirical testing alone does not justify the pragmatic value of scientific theories, but rather that social and methodological processes select those theories with the closest "fit" to a given problem. The mere fact that a theory has survived the most rigorous empirical tests available does not, in the calculus of probability, predict its ability to survive future testing. Karl Popper used Newtonian physics as an example of a body of theories so thoroughly confirmed by testing as to be considered unassailable, but which were nevertheless overturned by Einstein's insights into the nature of space-time. For the evolutionary epistemologist, all theories are true only provisionally, regardless of the degree of empirical testing they have survived.

Process of discovering new abstract entities 

"Evolutionary epistemology" can also refer to the opposite of (onto)genetic epistemology, namely phylogenetic epistemology as the historical discovery and reification of abstractions that necessarily precedes the learning of such abstractions by individuals. Piaget dismissed this possibility, stating

"The fundamental hypothesis of genetic epistemology is that there is a parallelism between the progress made in the logical and rational organization of knowledge and the corresponding formative psychological processes.  Well, now, if that is our hypothesis, what will be our field of study?  Of course the most fruitful, most obvious field of study would be reconstituting human history: the history of human thinking in prehistoric man. Unfortunately, we are not very well informed about the psychology of Neanderthal man or about the psychology of Homo siniensis of Teilhard de Chardin.  Since this field of biogenesis is not available to us, we shall do as biologists do and turn to ontogenesis.  Nothing could be more accessible to study than the ontogenesis of these notions. There are children all around us."

Piaget was mistaken in so quickly dismissing the study of phylogenetic epistemology, as there is much historical data available about the origins and evolution of the various notational systems that reify different kinds of abstract entity.

Popper gave its first comprehensive treatment in his 1970 article "Sketch of an Evolutionary Epistemology", after Donald T. Campbell had coined the phrase in a letter to Popper  in 1963. Campbell wrote on evolutionary epistemology in 1974; Piaget alluded to it in 1974 and described the concept as one of five possible theories in The Origins of Intelligence in Children (1936).

See also

References

Sources
 Campbell, D. T., letter to Karl Popper, Popper archive 'Karl-Popper-Sammlung', University of Klagenfurt, box 282, folder 12, see H.-J. Niemann, Popper, Darwin and Biology, in G. Franco (ed.) Handbuch Karl Popper, Springer Nature 2019, 359-380.
 Harms, William F., Information and Meaning in Evolutionary Processes (Cambridge Studies in Philosophy and Biology) , 2004
 Kress, O. A new approach to cognitive development: ontogenesis and the process of initiation. Evolution and Cognition (1993) Vol 2(4): 319-332.
 Piaget, J. Genetic Epistemology. 1974
 Popper, Karl R. Objective Knowledge, An Evolutionary Approach. Oxford University Press, 1972.
 Riedl, R. Biology of Knowledge: The Evolutionary Basis of Reason, Chichester: John Wiley & Sons, 1984.
 Schilpp, P. A., ed. The Philosophy of Karl R. Popper. LaSalle, IL. Open Court. 1974. See Campbell's essay, "Evolutionary Epistemology" on pp.412–463.
 Toulmin, Stephen Human Understanding: Volume 1: The Collective Use and Evolution of Concepts, 1972.

External links 
 
 
 
 
 Links on Evolutionary Theory and Memetics from Principia Cybernetica Web
 Selection Theory Bibliography by Gary A. Cziko and Donald T. Campbell

Epistemological theories
Evolution
Internalism and externalism